William "Billy Bass" Nelson (born January 28, 1951) is a U.S. musician, who was the original bassist for Funkadelic. He is a member of the Rock and Roll Hall of Fame, inducted in 1997 with fifteen other members of Parliament-Funkadelic.

Career 
Nelson was born in Plainfield, New Jersey and as a teenager worked at George Clinton's barbershop, sweeping the floor and singing and dancing for the customers. Clinton was a member of the doo wop vocal group the Parliaments, who scored a nationwide hit in 1967 with the song "(I Wanna) Testify". Clinton put together a backing band as musical support for a tour and recruited Nelson, who in turn recommended his friend Eddie Hazel. Nelson and Hazel eventually took on bass and lead guitar roles respectively. The backing band was originally unnamed, but Nelson later coined the name "Funkadelic" to reflect the style (funk) and connect it with the then-burgeoning psychedelic music scene.

By 1970, Funkadelic was a full band consisting of Nelson, Hazel, drummer Tiki Fulwood, guitarist Tawl Ross, and keyboardist Mickey Atkins (later replaced by Bernie Worrell). Since 1967 the band had been billed as the musical backing for The Parliaments. Due to legal problems, in the early 1970s Clinton had temporarily lost the rights to the name "The Parliaments" and instead signed the entire ensemble to Westbound Records under the name Funkadelic. Nelson was a prominent contributor to the first three Funkadelic albums, Funkadelic (1970), Free Your Mind... and Your Ass Will Follow (1970), and Maggot Brain (1971).

Nelson left the group in late 1971 after a financial dispute with George Clinton (making Nelson the first Parliament-Funkadelic member to defect over such concerns, foreshadowing a major problem that would haunt Clinton in the late 1970s). Nelson and Hazel next performed with The Temptations. Nelson rejoined Funkadelic briefly in the studio in 1975, playing on the track "Better By the Pound" on the Funkadelic album Let's Take It To The Stage. Nelson later played with The Commodores, Chairmen of the Board, Fishbone, Jermaine Jackson, Parlet, Lionel Richie, Smokey Robinson, and Lenny Williams.

In the 1990s, Nelson enjoyed a surge of name-checking by such legendary bassists as John Norwood Fisher (of Fishbone) and Flea (of the Red Hot Chili Peppers), while his early Funkadelic work was being sampled often by hip hop artists. Joining with some other P-Funk alumni, in 1994 Nelson released the album Out of the Dark under the name O.G. Funk. Since 1994 he has served in various touring lineups of Parliament-Funkadelic. He  has also toured with P-Funk spinoff acts the 420 Funk Mob and Sons of Funk.

References

P-Funk members
American bass guitarists
1951 births
Living people
Musicians from Plainfield, New Jersey
Guitarists from New Jersey
American male guitarists
20th-century American guitarists
American male bass guitarists